The Power of the Dog (Soundtrack from the Netflix Film) is the score album composed by Radiohead's Jonny Greenwood to the 2021 film The Power of the Dog. It was released by Lakeshore Records and Invada Records on November 17, 2021. The score album features 17 tracks, and featured a range of modern instruments used in scoring, despite being set in the 1920s. The score ranged from contemporary music to dark ambient and orchestral sounds, achieved by blending instruments in the sounds. Greenwood's score received positive critical response and received several accolades and nominations at various ceremonies, including Academy, Golden Globe, Grammy and BAFTA award nominations.

Background 
Campion recruited Jonny Greenwood to compose the score for The Power of the Dog. Speaking to the Variety, she said "He thought a lot about instruments and creating a palette for the instruments in the way that designers often do". While writing the score, Greenwood rendered the 1920s music of Montana as uncanny, foreboding rhythms which feel essential to the film's mix of oddity and dread in the concluding moments, that culminates "a disquieting cascade of disparate notes". Greenwood said "I’m a big fan of these musical scales that are called modes of limited transposition. As well as major and minor scales, you have modes. And some modes are more interesting than others. The one used there has four different tonal centers, so it’s like having four keys at once—which means that you never really resolve harmonically to the home chord."

Greenwood wanted to avoid the "sweeping strings" typical of Westerns, opting instead to use atonal brass sounds in order to emphasize the "alien and forbidding" nature of the film's landscapes. He was inspired from the music of Star Trek: The Original Series (1966), which had a contemporary brass sounds. To achieve this, he hired a couple of French horn players from the orchestra and recorded it in a church in Oxford, intending that "that reverb in the church would be the third instrument". He was not satisfied with the sound of Phil's banjo on screen, as he "wanted to tap into the darker side of the instrument, which would almost mirror Phil’s personality". As an alternative, he used to play the cello like a banjo on his own, using the same fingerpicking technique. The resulting sound, according to Greenwood, was "a nice confusion" and "a sound you recognize, but it's not a style that you’re familiar with." As a result of the COVID-19 pandemic and the gathering restrictions in place, Greenwood was unable to work with an orchestra and had to record much of the cello parts on his own, layering them to achieve an orchestral texture.

Greenwood used a computer-controlled mechanical piano, and for scoring it he bought a piano tuning wrench, as he could detune the strings while playing. He made use of the programming software: Max/MSP to modify the sound and pitch. The instrument suited for the character, Rose, as "not only is her story wrapped up in the instrument, but it was also a good texture for her gradual mental unraveling".  He worked on recording the piano score for hours, so that the tunes could be adjusted. For creating themes for Phil, Greenwood used horns and dark strings seemed a good direction to go in. He did not use violins for scoring, and instead stuck to the lower sounds of cellos and violas.

Despite being a period film, Greenwood opted to use modern sounds. Calling about this approach, Greenwood said that "This film has such an unusual tone: Me playing pastiche American folk music would never suit all the repressed conflict or Phil’s dark, angry intelligence".

Release 
On October 27, 2021, Jonny Greenwood announced the release of two songs: "25 Years" and "West" through digital platforms. Variety magazine, debuted the tracks exclusively online, featuring a review for the first track saying "it is an infectious melody, which orchestrating a dark, brooding selection blended with a light honky-tonk undertone that matches perfectly with the period" and listeners "may find more of his signature stylistic eclecticism, which showcases an emotional pastiche from his work on The Master (2012)".

Lakeshore Records and Invada Records released the soundtrack on November 17, 2021, through digital (audio streaming) and physical (CD and vinyl) formats. In addition to the soundtracks, a For Your Consideration album, featuring 16 tracks from the original score was released in December 2021, to showcase the score in various award ceremonies for 2021.

Track listing

Reception 
Pitchfork's Brian Howe wrote "Greenwood must be the only artist who has both headlined Coachella and collaborated with Krzysztof Penderecki, the Polish composer whose turbulent tone clusters he often evokes in The Power of the Dog. When those shivers course through the strings, it might be the cry of night-veiled coyotes or a wail at the edge where one world ends and another begins. That double image perfectly exemplifies Greenwood’s own synthesis of pulp-Western brawn and refined symphonic emotion." James Southall of Movie Wave wrote "A word about the album, by the way – with cues presented radically out of sequence in terms of their appearance in the film, and with some missing – it’s been produced the old-fashioned way, with the optimal listening experience in mind – and is all the stronger for it." Jonathan Broxton wrote "As actual music, though, it’s a tougher sell. Some of it is very discordant and challenging, there is almost no conventional emotional content to latch onto, and anyone who needs identifiable thematic content in order to truly connect with a score will find it lacking." The New Yorker, IndieWire, and Insider Inc.  called it as "one of the best film score of 2021".

Awards and nominations

References 

Jonny Greenwood albums
2021 soundtrack albums